"Way Too Long" is a song recorded by British duo Audio Bullys, it was released as the fourth single of their debut album Ego War on 1 September 2003 by record label Source.

Composition
"Way Too Long" is a "shouted" staccato rap track. The song contains a sample of a "tiny little guitar lick" from Elvis Costello & The Attractions’ 1978 song “(I Don't Want to Go to) Chelsea”. The song tells the fictional story of "Stevie," whom Simon Donohue from Manchester Evening News described as "some dodgy drug dealing fella  who falls foul of the people he thought were his mates."

Critical and commercial reception

Simon Donohue of Manchester Evening News opened his review by saying: "If The Streets' Mike Skinner was the amiable southern geezer, then [Audio Bullys] sound like the scoundrels who nick his mobile phone on the last tube home." Despite stating that the song is not the "best piece of bait" for their album, the writer still called it "strangely endearing." Adrien Begrand of PopMatters disagreed, he praised the song for being "spectacular" despite its only over two minutes length. The author also praised their use of Costello and The Attractions' sample as "jaw-dropping" and "mesmerizing."

The single is their first failed to chart in the United Kingdom, however, it was the duo's first song to chart on Netherlands' Single Top 100. Debuting on the chart at number 86 on 13 September 2003, the song dropped to number 98 on its second and last week.

Music video
The music video of "Way Too Long" was directed by British director Jake Nava.

Track listings and formats
UK 12" single
 "Way Too Long"  – 5:51
 "Way Too Long"  – 7:23

UK enhanced maxi single
 "Way Too Long"  – 2:14
 "Way Too Long"  – 5:51
 "Way Too Long"  – 7:23
 "Way Too Long"  – 2:54
 "Way Too Long"  – 3:21

Credits
Credits adapted from the liner notes of Ego War.

Recording and management
 Published by EMI Music Publishing Ltd./BMG Music Publishing Ltd.

Personnel
 Audio Bullys – writing, production, performer, mixing
 Elvis Costello – writing
 Alan Mawdsley – mixing

Charts

References

External links

2003 singles
2003 songs
Audio Bullys songs
Music videos directed by Jake Nava